Yun Na-rae (born 24 April 1997) is a South Korean artistic gymnast. She won bronze medals in the individual all-around and on the floor exercise at the 2014 Asian Games. It is the first medal won by South Korea in Women's artistic individual all-around at the Asian Games. After the Asian Games, she competed at the 2014 World Artistic Gymnastics Championships in Nanning, China. However, she had watered down routines and didn't qualify to the all-around final.

Education
Daegu Physical Education High School

References

External links
Yun Narae at Fédération Internationale de Gymnastique

Living people
South Korean female artistic gymnasts
Asian Games medalists in gymnastics
Gymnasts at the 2014 Asian Games
Gymnasts at the 2018 Asian Games
1997 births
Sportspeople from Daegu
Asian Games bronze medalists for South Korea
Medalists at the 2014 Asian Games
21st-century South Korean women